Admiral Charles Frederick Corbett, CB, MVO (21 November 1867 – 29 January 1955) was a Royal Navy officer.

Biography 
The son of Admiral Sir John Corbett, Charles Corbett entered HMS Britannia as a cadet in 1881.

From 1914 to 1916, he was captain of the pre-dreadnought battleship HMS Glory, during which he was appointed a CB and was commended for services relating to the evacuation of Gallipoli.

Corbett was placed on the retired list at his own request in 1922. He was promoted vice-admiral on the retired list in 1924 and admiral on the retired list in 1928.

References 

1867 births
1955 deaths
Royal Navy admirals
Royal Navy admirals of World War I
Companions of the Order of the Bath
Members of the Royal Victorian Order